Voroshilovsky District may refer to:

Voroshilovsky District, Russia, name of several districts in Russia
Voroshylovskyi Raion, a district of the city of Donetsk, DPR; see University Street, Donetsk